"Amin, Amin, ya Rabaljalil" (Jawi: امين امين يا رب الجليل) is the anthem of Perlis, Malaysia. The lyrics are written in an admixture of Malay and Arabic.

History 
In 1930, Syed Hamzah ibni al-Marhum Syed Safi Jamalullail, the fifth Raja of Perlis, and at the time serving as Vice President of the Perlis State Council, composed the tune to Amin, Amin, ya Rabaljalil. Jamalullail then asked R. G. Iles, the State Engineer, to transcribe and harmonise it, since he was not proficient at reading or writing music.

Subsequently, the tune was orchestrated by Captain Edgar Lenthall, bandmaster for the Central Band of the Royal Malay Regiment. It would be adopted as state anthem of Perlis in 1935.

Lyrics

References

Notes

External links 
 The Anthem (Vocal)

Perlis
Anthems of Malaysia
1930 songs